Uromyces ciceris-arietini is a plant pathogen infecting chickpea.

References

External links
 Index Fungorum
 USDA ARS Fungal Database

Fungal plant pathogens and diseases
Pulse crop diseases
ciceris-arietini
Fungi described in 1863